Strife was a multiplayer online battle arena (MOBA) video game developed by S2 Games. This is S2 Games' second MOBA game aimed to a more casual player base than Heroes of Newerth, most notably incorporating various gameplay elements that focus on heavily reducing player toxicity and introducing persistent mechanics outside of the arena, including Pets and Crafting. The game uses an engine called Kodiak which is based on the Heroes of Newerth (K2 Engine) with some improvements on lighting and physics.

Gameplay
Strife pits two teams of players against each other, both teams are based at opposite corners of the map in their respective bases. Bases consist of one central structure, creep spawn points, three generators and a hero spawning pool. The goal of the game is to destroy the central structure of the opposite base, called the "Crux". Players achieve this by selecting heroes with unique skills to combat the other team, both teams can select the same heroes. Each game a player chooses one hero to be for the duration of the match. Every hero has four abilities that may be acquired and upgraded as the hero gains experience and levels up. Heroes abilities are often very similar to the ones of the characters of several other MOBA games.

Development
Strife was announced on August 8, 2013 after it had been in development for 2 years.

, Strife went in closed beta.

 Strife went in open beta.

 Strife has been published on Steam as an early access game.

 Strife has been released as a free-to-play on Steam.

 Strife servers have been shut down without comment from developers with S2 Games being quietly closed down.

See also
 Savage: The Battle for Newerth
 Savage 2: A Tortured Soul
 Heroes of Newerth

References

External links
 

2015 video games
Free-to-play video games
Multiplayer online battle arena games
Multiplayer online games
Multiplayer video games
Online games
S2 Games
Video games developed in the United States
Windows games
Early access video games
Linux games
MacOS games